Le Pertre (；) is a commune in the Ille-et-Vilaine department of Brittany in northwestern France.

Heritage

The church of Saint-Martin-de-Vertou is located in the centre of the village. The steeple of the church was originally constructed to a height of 83 metres in 1920.  However due to repairs, especially after the fall of the steeple of 1982, the height may have changed. It is possible to access a parapet located at 37 metres from the ground. Legend has it that thirty-nine bell towers are visible in good weather from the top of the church.

Le Pertre forest has an area of 1,513 hectares.  It is an oak grove which was classified, in 1997, as a natural area of ecological interest, faunistic and floristic. It has some ornithological interest since thirty-two species of birds are listed there, five of which are uncommon in the region (Honey Buzzard, Common Hawk, Hoopoe, Redstart, and Woodpecker). In addition, this forest has two species of bats.

Population
Inhabitants of Le Pertre are called in French pertrais.

See also
Communes of the Ille-et-Vilaine department

References

External links

Official website Le Pertre 

Mayors of Ille-et-Vilaine Association 

Communes of Ille-et-Vilaine